Severyn (Semerii) Nalyvaiko (in older historiography also Semen Nalewajko, died 21 April 1597) was a leader of the Ukrainian Cossacks who became a hero of Ukrainian folklore. He led the failed Nalyvaiko Uprising for which he was tortured and executed in Warsaw. The Decembrist poet Kondraty Ryleyev wrote a poem about him.

Biography
Nalyvaiko was born in the town of Husiatyn not far from Ternopil into a furrier's family. After the killing of his father by the servants of the magnate Kalinowski he moved with his mother to Ostroh where his elder brother was a seminary student. He later served with the registered Cossacks under Prince Kostiantyn Vasyl Ostrozky in the army of Grand Duchy of Lithuania. In 1593 he fought against the rebellious Zaporozhian Cossacks led by Krzysztof Kosiński during the Kosiński Uprising. He left the service in 1594, and organized a paramilitary unit of unregistered cossacks in the vicinity of Bratslav, and raided several Moldavian and Hungarian towns. The following year, Nalivaiko's Cossacks were joined by many run-away Ukrainian peasants and captured the town of Lutsk where his men massacred Polish nobility, Catholic clergy and local Greek-Catholics. From Volhynia Nalivaiko's Cossacks moved into Belarus, where they pillaged Mogilev.

Nalivaiko eventually offered peace to the Polish king Sigismund III Vasa, conditioned that the Poles cede the lands between Southern Buh and Dniester rivers south of Bratslav to the Cossacks in exchange for their military service and loyalty to the Polish–Lithuanian Commonwealth. Having refused these terms, the king recalled Stanisław Żółkiewski from Moldavia to quell the Nalivaiko Uprising, which had engulfed most of Polish crown lands in Ukraine and Belarus (that time called Ruthenia) by 1596.
 
Nalivaiko joined his forces with the Cossack Hetman Hryhory Loboda (Polish: Hryhor Łoboda) but was forced to retreat to the Left-bank Ukraine. In May 1596 the Cossack tabor was surrounded by Poles near the town of Lubny. The Cossacks fought for two weeks before running out of food and water. Thereupon they handed over Severyn Nalivaiko to the Poles in exchange for their own lives. After Nalivaiko's surrender there came to unplanned fight between Polish and Cossack troops, which turned into massacre of those who didn't want to surrender. Nalivaiko was brought to Warsaw in a cage and publicly quartered. There were contemporary stories about him being crowned with a white-hot iron crown or boiled alive in a copper cauldron, but they are not verified by factual evidence.

See also
List of Ukrainian rulers

References 

16th-century births
1597 deaths

Year of birth unknown
People from Husiatyn
Hetmans of the Zaporozhian Cossacks
Cossack rebels
Cossack uprisings
People executed by the Polish–Lithuanian Commonwealth
Executed Ukrainian people
Ukrainian people executed abroad
16th-century executions by Poland
People executed by dismemberment